Pulaski County is the name of seven counties in the United States, all of which are named for Casimir Pulaski:

 Pulaski County, Arkansas
 Pulaski County, Georgia
 Pulaski County, Illinois
 Pulaski County, Indiana
 Pulaski County, Kentucky
 Pulaski County, Missouri
 Pulaski County, Virginia